Nikhil Manipuri Mahasabha, initially called Nikhil Hindu Manipuri Mahasabha, was founded in Manipur in 1934 with the Maharaja Churachand Singh as its president. The organisation was opposed to the increasing foreign Christian evangelistic aggression, and sought to protect the interests of Hindus in the state.

1st Session, NHMM, Imphal, 1934
The NMM was originally known as the Nikhil Manipuri Hindu Mahasabha. It was founded under the patronage of Maharaja Churachand Singh who was the president of the organization. All works were carried out by Hijam Irabot who was the vice-president.

2nd Session, NHMM, Tarepur,1936
The second session was held at Tarepur in Silchar.Maharaja Churachand was the  Chairman of the session, Hijam Irabot was selected as the secretary of the Mahasabha.

3rd Session, NHMM, Mandalay,1937
The third session was held at Mandalay in Burma.Hijam Irabot was the chairman of the session.

4th Session, NMM, Chinga, 1938
This session was held at Chinga in Manipur. Maharaja Churachand did not attend the session. Irabot changed the name of the sabha by dropping the Hindu off the original name. He also changed it into a political party.
Maharaja Churachand sent a warning to Irabot on the events taking place in his absence.

2nd Nupilal, 1939
A section of the NMM split to join the second Nupilal. They called themselves the Praja Sanmelani which was established on 7 January 1940.

Second World War,1939-1945
During the Second World War, many NMM leaders joined the Indian National Army. They took a minor role in the Battle of Imphal.

References

Political parties in Manipur
Indian Hindu political parties
1934 establishments in India
Political parties established in 1934
Hindu nationalism